Getman is a surname. Notable people with the surname include:

 Andrei Getman (1903–1987), Soviet military commander
 İqor Getman (born 1971), Azerbaijani soccer coach and former player
 Julius Getman (born 1931), American law professor and labor historian
 Mike Getman (born c. 1959), American soccer player and collegiate coach
 Nikolai Getman (1917–2004), Soviet painter

See also 
 Hetman, a historical political and military title in Central and Eastern Europe